Arlen López Cardona (born 21 February 1993) is a Cuban professional boxer. López was a highly accomplished amateur, winning gold medals at both the 2016 and 2020 Summer Olympics. López also won gold medals at both the 2015 and 2019 Pan American Games, the 2014 and 2018 Central American and Caribbean Games and the 2015 World Championships.

Amateur career

Olympic results
Rio 2016
Round of 16: Defeated Zoltán Harcsa (Hungary) TKO
Quarter-finals: Defeated Christian M'billi (France) 3–0
Semi-finals: Defeated Kamran Shakhsuvarly (Azerbaijan) 3–0
Final: Defeated Bektemir Melikuziev (Uzbekistan) 3–0

Tokyo 2020
Round of 16: Defeated Mohammed Houmri (Algeria) 5–0
Quarter-finals: Defeated Rogelio Romero (Mexico) 5–0
Semi-finals: Defeated Loren Alfonso (Azerbaijan) 5–0
Final: Defeated Benjamin Whittaker (Great Britain) 4–1

World Championship results
Doha 2015
Round of 16: Defeated Aljaz Venko (Slovenia) 3–0
Quarter-finals: Defeated Marlo Delgado (Ecuador) 3–0
Semi-finals: Defeated Hosam Bakr Abdin (Egypt) 3–0
Final: Defeated Bektemir Melikuziev (Uzbekistan) 2–1

Hamburg 2017
Round of 16: Defeated Salvatore Cavallaro (Italy) 5–0
Quarter-finals: Defeated by Abilkhan Amankul (Kazakhstan) 3–2

Yekaterinburg 2019 
Second round: Defeated Younes Nemouchi (Algeria) 5–0
Third round: Defeated Euri Cedeño (Dominican Republic) 4–1
Quarter-finals: Defeated by Gleb Bakshi (Russia) 3–2

Pan American Games results
Toronto 2015
Quarter-finals: Defeated Jason Ramírez (Costa Rica) 3–0
Semi-finals: Defeated Endry Saaverda (Venezuela) 3–0
Final: Defeated Jorge Vivas (Colombia) 3–0

Lima 2019
Quarter-finals: Defeated Euri Cedeño (Dominican Republic) 4–1
Semi-finals: Defeated Lesther Espino (Nicaragua) 5–0
Final: Defeated Hebert Conceição (Brazil) 5–0

Professional career

Early career
In April 2022, it was announced that Cuban amateur boxers would have the ability to fight professionally abroad for the first time since 1962, negating the need for boxers to defect from the country. López made his professional debut against Fernando Galvan on 20 May 2022. López won the bout the after knocking his opponent out with a left hook in the opening round.

Professional boxing record

References

External links
 

1993 births
Living people
Cuban male boxers
Pan American Games gold medalists for Cuba
Boxers at the 2015 Pan American Games
Boxers at the 2019 Pan American Games
Olympic boxers of Cuba
Boxers at the 2016 Summer Olympics
Boxers at the 2020 Summer Olympics
Olympic gold medalists for Cuba
Olympic medalists in boxing
Medalists at the 2016 Summer Olympics
Medalists at the 2020 Summer Olympics
Pan American Games medalists in boxing
Central American and Caribbean Games gold medalists for Cuba
Competitors at the 2014 Central American and Caribbean Games
AIBA World Boxing Championships medalists
Middleweight boxers
Central American and Caribbean Games medalists in boxing
Medalists at the 2015 Pan American Games
Medalists at the 2019 Pan American Games
People from Guantánamo
21st-century Cuban people